Daniel Diermeier (born July 16, 1965) is a German-American political scientist and university administrator. He is serving as the ninth Chancellor of Vanderbilt University. Previously, Diermeier was the David Lee Shillinglaw Distinguished Service Professor at the University of Chicago, where he also served as Provost. He succeeded Eric Isaacs on July 1, 2016, and was succeeded by Ka Yee Christina Lee on February 1, 2020.

Career
Educated at German and American Universities, Diermeier started his career as an assistant professor at the Graduate School of Business at Stanford University before joining the Department of Managerial Economics and Decision Sciences at Northwestern University's Kellogg School of Management. There he was the IBM Professor of Regulation and Competitive Practice and, later, director of the Ford Motor Company Center for Global Citizenship. He won multiple teaching awards including Professor of the Year Award in 2010, and Alumni Professor of the Year Award in 2013.

From 2014 to 2016, Diermeier served as Dean of the Harris School of Public Policy as well as the Emmet Dedmon Professor at the Harris School and The College at The University of Chicago. Under his leadership the Harris School increased the number of students and faculty, expanded key areas of scholarly research and led fundraising efforts for the renovation of the award-winning the Keller Center.

As Provost at UChicago, Diermeier was responsible for the academic and research programs, allocation of space across campus, and the University’s operating budget. In 2016 he reformed the University’s budgetary process. In October 2019, he announced a new funding model for doctoral education in the Divinity School, Division of the Humanities, Division of Social Sciences, and School of Social Service Administration, beginning in the 2022-23 academic year. The new model was based on three principles. First, all enrolled Ph.D. students will be funded for the duration of their program at the guaranteed stipend level. Second, teaching by Ph.D. students will be structured as mentored teaching experiences and separate from funding. Third, all funded divisions will have a total program size—the total number of PhD students across a particular school or division will be a fixed number, and new students will not be admitted until currently enrolled students graduate or leave their program. At the same time, the University expanded resources to support doctoral students in mentoring and in preparing them for non-academic post-graduate careers. Another signature achievement during his tenure was launching the Diversity & Inclusion Initiative which included a campus-wide climate survey and programs to improve the faculty pipeline of underrepresented minorities and women.

As provost of the University of Chicago, Diermeier earned a yearly salary of $997,412.

On December 4, 2019, Diermeier was announced as the ninth Chancellor of Vanderbilt University, beginning July 1, 2020, and was officially invested April 9, 2022.

Diermeier is a member of the American Academy of Arts and Sciences and a research fellow at the Canadian Institute of Advanced Research (CIFAR). In 2014, he was awarded a Guggenheim Fellowship in political science.

Research
Diermeier has published four books and more than 100 research articles in academic journals, mostly in the fields of political science, economics and management, but also in other areas ranging from linguistics, sociology and psychology to computer science, operations research and applied mathematics.

Diermeier has contributed to the theory of legislative institutions, including the study of committees in the U.S. Congress, governing coalitions in multi-party democracies and the formation and stability of coalition governments. He was one of the first political scientists to use structural estimation, e.g. in the study of political careers and coalitions, text analytical methods, and behavioral models in politics. In addition to his work in political science Diermeier has worked on issues of corporation reputations and the interaction between firms and social activists.

Opposition to graduate worker unions 
Diermeier opposes unionization among graduate student workers.

In 2019, Diermeier responded to three days of picketing and work stoppage by the group Graduate Students United at the University of Chicago  with an email that criticized unionization among graduate students.

Following his appointment as Vanderbilt's new chancellor, Diermeier argued that “unionization would fundamentally alter the decentralized, faculty-led approach to graduate education,” which would lead to “an environment of standardization” and “changing the nature and scope of the relationships of graduate students to their advisors.”

Other interests
Diermeier has served as a board member for the University of Chicago Medical Center, Argonne National Laboratory, the Civic Consulting Alliance, CityBase, the Marine Biological Laboratory, the National Opinion Research Center, the Field Museum of Natural History, and the management board of the Federal Bureau of Investigation. He also has been an advisor to governments, nonprofit organizations, and leading corporations, including Abbott, Accenture, Allianz, the City of Chicago, the Government of Canada, Ernst & Young, Exelon, the FBI, Hyatt, Johnson & Johnson, Medtronic, Metro Group, PricewaterhouseCoopers, State Farm, UnitedHealth Group, and the United States Olympic and Paralympic Committee.

Education
Diermeier holds a Ph.D. in political science from the University of Rochester and master's degrees from the University of Munich, University of Southern California, and University of Rochester.

Personal life
Diermeier was born in Berlin, and in 1984–1986 completed German National Civil Service in Munich. He is married and has two children.

Publications 
 Abito, J.M., Besanko, D., and Diermeier, D. (2019). Corporate Social Responsibility, Reputation and Private Politics: The Strategic Interaction between Activists and Firms. New York, NY: Oxford University Press.
 Diermeier, D. (2011). Reputation Rules: Strategies for Building Your Company’s Most Valuable Asset. New York, NY: McGraw-Hill.
 Bendor, J., Diermeier, D., Siegel, D. A., Ting, M. M. (2011). A Behavioral Theory of Elections. Princeton, NJ: Princeton University Press.
 Diermeier, D., & Feddersen, T.J. (1998). Cohesion in legislatures and the Vote of Confidence procedure. American Political Science Review, 92(3), 611-621.
 Diermeier, D., & Myerson, R.B. (1999). Bicameralism and its consequences for the internal organization of legislatures. American Economic Review, 89(5), 1182-1196.
 Baron, D., & Diermeier, D. (2001). Elections, governments, and parliaments in proportional representation systems. Quarterly Journal of Economics, 116(3), 933-967
 Diermeier, D., Eraslan, H., & Merlo, A. (2003). A structural model of government formation. Econometrica, 71(1), 27-70.
 Diermeier, D., Keane, M., & Merlo, A. (2005). A political economy model of congressional careers. American Economic Review, 95(1), 347-373.
 Baron, D., & Diermeier, D. (2007). Strategic activism and non-market strategy. Journal of Economics and Management Strategy, 16(3), 599-634.
 Beigman-Klebanov, B., Beigman, E., & Diermeier, D. (2008). Lexical cohesion analysis of political speech. Political Analysis, 16(4): 447-463.
 Diermeier, D., Egorov, G., and Sonin, K. (2017). Political Economy of Redistribution. Econometrica. 85(3):851-70.

References 

1965 births
Living people
University of Chicago faculty
German economists
21st-century American economists
German emigrants to the United States
People from Berlin